Big Night! is a 2021 Philippine black comedy film directed by Jun Robles Lana.

Cast
Christian Bables as Dharna/Panfilo Macaspac, Jr., a gay beautician who is determined to clear his name after he found he was included in a drug watchlist.
Nicco Antonio
Sunshine Teodoro as Biba
Eugene Domingo as Madam
Ricky Davao as Dharna's father
Gina Alajar as Dharna's mother
Soliman Cruz
John Arcilla as Donato Rapido
Janice De Belen as Melba, the president of Area 5
Awra Briguela as Galema, Dharna's gay youngest sibling.
Sue Prado

The film also includes cameo appearances from Gina Pareno, Martin Del Rosario, Ogie Diaz,  Allan Paule, VJ Mendoza, and Cedrick Juan

Production
Big Night! was directed by Jun Robles Lana and is a co-production by Cignal Entertainment, The IdeaFirst Company, Octobertrain Films, and Quantum Films. Lana decided to use the war on drugs initiated by President Rodrigo Duterte as the setting of his film. Principal photography of Big Night! took place from January 2020 to mid-2020. Community quarantine measures were imposed as a response to the COVID-19 pandemic at the middle of the filming, thus part of the film had to be made under a lock-in set-up. Among the filming locations was the Quezon Institute.

Release
Big Night! premiered on November 25, 2021, at the 25th Tallinn Black Nights Film Festival in Estonia. The film will have its theatrical release in the Philippines on December 25, 2021, as one of the eight official entries of the 2021 Metro Manila Film Festival.

Accolades

References

Philippine black comedy films
2021 black comedy films
Films directed by Jun Robles Lana
2021 LGBT-related films
Philippine LGBT-related films